Sugar Loaf Township, Arkansas may refer to:

 Sugar Loaf Township, Boone County, Arkansas
 Sugar Loaf Township, Cleburne County, Arkansas

See also 
 List of townships in Arkansas
 Sugarloaf Township (disambiguation)

Arkansas township disambiguation pages